The Glass Harmonica may refer to:

 Glass harmonica, a musical instrument
 The Glass Harmonica, a 2000 novel by Louise Marley
 Glass Harmonica, a 1968 short animated film by Andrey Khrzhanovskiy

See also
Harmonica